Minto is a village and parish in the Scottish Borders area of Scotland in Roxburghshire county.

Geography 
The parish is bounded on the west by the former parish of Wilton (united with Hawick in 1895 ), on the north by Lilliesleaf, on the east by Ancrum and on the south by the parish of Cavers, whose boundary partially follows the River Teviot, and the village of Denholm within that parish. Fatlips Castle and Hassendean are within the parish.

Minto village is a Conservation Area as designated by Scottish Borders Council.

Minto House, the former seat of the Earls of Minto, once stood nearby.

Minto comes within the area of Denholm and District Community Council, whose area north of the Teviot is roughly the same area as Minto civil parish, except for the Appletreehall area in the west. Appletreehall is a hamlet of Wilton parish.

The civil parish has an area of 5,601 acres

Demographics 
The population was 322 in 2011.  The population of Minto village was estimated at 58 based on the 2001 Census.

History 
The town of Minto first appears in 1383 in a list of rentals paid to Roxburgh Castle. It was burned in a raid about 1490, then again in 1545 along with most of the surrounding area. It stretched in a staggered line along a north-west axis near the old church. Another cluster of houses stood on the roadside near West Lodge; one was occupied by the village cooper, giving rise to the Cooper’s Brae. The old town had a change house, a public host house, a brew-house (supplied by local barley malted nearby), a school (established in the 17th century) and a shop. Lint fields behind Minto Crags were spun and woven into linen by the villagers, while Minto Moss, Langhope, and Shielswood provided peats for fuel. There was also a mill near South Lodge on the Ancrum road, fed by a cauld above Spittal Ford.

In 1827-31, the village was moved in its entirety so the 2nd Earl of Minto wouldn’t be able to see it from his mansion, Minto House! The new village was designed and laid out by William Playfair within the Earl's estate. It occupies an elevated ridge overlooking the River Teviot and lies in a dip below Minto Hill   (height 905  ft)

Minto Church, designed in 1831 by William Henry Playfair, is a Gothic revival church with a large three-stage tower. It was built during the ministry of Rev David Aitken who served as minister from 1829 to 1866 and replaced an earlier church. The interior was renovated in 1934, but the exterior is little changed.

Minto War Memorial is a listed building situated near the church in the centre of Minto. It was created in 1921 by locally born sculptor Thomas J Clapperton and is a bronze statue of a First World War soldier in helmet and greatcoat, standing on guard with bayonet.

In 1992 Minto House was listed as Category A, and largely demolished within weeks. The garden terraces had been added by Robert Lorimer in 1904.

The parish originally covered the same area as the barony of Minto, which was first mentioned in the 14th century, when it was in possession of the Turnbull family. It was later sold to Sir Gilbert Elliot (c. 1650–1718), the ancestor of the Earls of Minto, who was made a Baronet by King William in 1700.

Hassendean, the valley of Hassendean Burn, lies in the western part of the parish and was a parish until shortly after the Reformation. The use of its church was suppressed in 1690 and the building gradually became dilapidated, lying next to the banks of the Teviot. Its churchyard continued in use until 1796 when it was swept away by a flood.

See also 
 List of listed buildings in Minto, Scottish Borders

References

External links 

Minto in the Scottish Gazetteer

 for village website

Villages in the Scottish Borders
Parishes in Roxburghshire